Shaun Valentine (born 13 April 1976) is an Australian former rugby league footballer who played for the North Queensland Cowboys in the National Rugby League.

Playing career
A Brisbane Brothers junior, Valentine played for the Wests Panthers in the Queensland Cup from 1996 to 1999. In 1998, he started at centre in the Panthers' Grand Final loss to the Norths Devils. In 1999, due to a partnership between the Panthers and North Queensland Cowboys, Valentine joined the NRL club. That year he was selected to represent the Queensland Residents side.

In Round 14 of the 1999 NRL season, Valentine made his NRL debut in the Cowboys' 8–22 loss to the Cronulla Sharks at Dairy Farmers Stadium. In Round of 17 of the 1999 season, he scored his first NRL try in the Cowboys' 32–18 win over the Sydney City Roosters.

In 2000, Valentine played 18 NRL games, the most he would play in a season. Valentine suffered a number of concussions during his career, playing just 10 games over the next seasons. He was released by the Cowboys at the end of the 2002 season and subsequently retired.

Statistics

NRL
 Statistics are correct to the end of the 2002 season

Post-playing career
In 2011, Valentine, who suffered seven concussions in an 18-month period during his career, agreed to donate his brain to the Concussion Legacy Foundation at Boston University after meeting with the foundation's co-founder Chris Nowinski.

References

1976 births
Living people
Australian rugby league players
North Queensland Cowboys players
Rugby league players from Brisbane
Rugby league props
Rugby league second-rows
Wests Panthers players